Camille Froidevaux-Metterie (born November 18, 1968) is a French philosopher, researcher and professor of political science. Her work focuses on the transformations of the female condition in the contemporary era, in a phenomenological perspective that places the question of the body at the center of the reflection. Her work also focuses on women's reappropriation of their bodies as expressed in recent feminist movements dealing with issues related to intimacy and female genitality (notably the Harvey Weinstein affair and the MeToo movement). In 2017, she was awarded the Chevalier de l'ordre national du Mérite.

Biography
Camille Froidevaux-Metterrie was born in Paris, 1968.

Her 1997 dissertation at the School for Advanced Studies in the Social Sciences was under the direction of Marcel Gauchet and was entitled, .

She initially devoted her research career to the study of the relationship between politics and religion in the Western sphere, from her thesis on the German sociologist, Ernst Troeltsch, to her work on the theological-political question in the United States. She was a lecturer in political science at the Paris-Panthéon-Assas University from 2002 to 2011. 

In 2010, she made a thematic conversion to focus on contemporary changes affecting the status of women. She studies the consequences of feminist conquests on the reorganization of the division of the private-female and public-masculine spheres, highlighting a phenomenon of "desexualization of the world". On this basis, she reflects on the meaning of women's bodies in a phenomenological perspective. 

From 2010 to 2015, she was a member of the Institut Universitaire de France. Since 2011, she has been a professor at the University of Reims Champagne-Ardenne, where she is also in charge of the Equality and Diversity program.

From a sociological point of view, her research has led to a large-scale survey of French women politicians, which has resulted in a docu-drama entitled 9. From a philosophical approach, her research has led to a series of articles10 and a book entitled , published in 2015 by Éditions Gallimard. 

From 2012 to 2018, she popularized her work on the blog "Féminin singulier" of the website . Her expertise on issues of gender inequality and feminist movements is regularly solicited by the French media.

In September 2021, she published . She places her essay in the continuity of feminist philosophy: Simone de Beauvoir and Iris Marion Young.

Awards and honours
 Knight, Ordre national du Mérite (May 2, 2017)

Selected works
  (from her thesis defended in 1997)

Novels

References

1968 births
Living people
Academics from Paris
Women's studies academics
French women philosophers
Feminist philosophers
French feminists
21st-century French women writers
21st-century French non-fiction writers
Sciences Po alumni
Academic staff of Paris 2 Panthéon-Assas University